Peckoltia greedoi is a species of armored catfish from the Gurupí River drainage of Brazil.

Etymology
The species was described in 2015 by a team of researchers from Auburn University in Alabama. The researchers named it after the character Greedo from George Lucas' Star Wars franchise, stating that the species and the character shared a "remarkable resemblance".

References

Ancistrini
Taxa named by Jonathan W. Armbruster
Freshwater fish of Brazil
Fish described in 2015